Chanel Beckenlehner (born September 9, 1988) is a Canadian beauty pageant competitor who was crowned Miss Universe Canada 2014 and represented Canada at the Miss Universe 2014 pageant.

Early life
Chanel Beckenlehner attended the University of Toronto, and completed her bachelor's degree in political science.

Pageantry

Miss Universe Canada 2009
Beckenlehner was crowned as the Miss International Canada title of the Miss Universe Canada 2009 and placed in top 12 at the pageant. Meanwhile, the official winner in that year was Mariana Valente from Richmond Hill, Ontario taken the crown and represented Canada at Miss Universe 2009 in Nassau, Bahamas.

Miss International 2009
Beckenlehner was appointed as the official representative of Canada for Miss International 2009 in Chengdu, China and placed as the Top 15 where Anagabriela Espinoza of Mexico was crowned as Miss International 2009.

Miss Universe Canada 2014
Beckenlehner continued to compete in 2014 and won the title of Miss Universe Canada 2014, representing Caledon. She later represented Canada at Miss Universe 2014, which was held in Doral, Florida, US, but did not make the Top 15. She did however make the Top 5 for the National Costume competition.

References

1988 births
Living people
Canadian beauty pageant winners
Canadian people of German descent
Miss Universe 2014 contestants
People from Caledon, Ontario
Miss International 2009 delegates
Female models from Ontario